Friedkin Uncut is a 2018 Italian documentary film written and directed by Francesco Zippel. It tells the life and career of the film director William Friedkin. The film had its world premiere at the 75th Venice International Film Festival on 31 August 2018. It was released in Italy on 5 November 2018.

Cast

Release
The film had its world premiere at the 75th Venice International Film Festival on 31 August 2018. It was released in Italy on 5 November 2018. In the United States, it was released in limited theaters on 23 August 2019.

Reception
On Metacritic, the film has a weighted average score of 68 out of 100, based on 6 critics, indicating "generally favorable reviews".

Michael Nordine of IndieWire gave the film a grade of B, commenting that "There's nothing particularly new or inspired about Zippel's decision to simply train a camera on Friedkin and let him riff, but the man is such a captivating speaker that it ultimately doesn't matter much." Matt Zoller Seitz of RogerEbert.com gave the film 3 out of 4 stars, writing, "Even viewers of a certain age who grew up on Friedkin's movies and watched the major ones over and over will come away from this movie feeling as if they understand him in a new, deeper way." Deborah Young of The Hollywood Reporter wrote, "this enjoyable doc records a Hollywood master looking back at his career with lucid hindsight and irony."

The film won the 2019 Nastro d'Argento award for Best Documentary About Cinema. It was nominated for the 2019 David di Donatello award for Best Documentary.

References

External links
 

2018 films
2018 documentary films
Italian documentary films
Documentary films about film directors and producers
2010s English-language films